Waiata is the seventh studio album by New Zealand new wave band Split Enz, released in March 1981. Its Australian release was titled Corroboree. Waiata is the Māori term for song and singing, while corroboree is an Aboriginal term. According to Noel Crombie the intention was to name the album using a word from the natives of every country it was released in. This did not go ahead and the only country to adopt this change was Australia. The rest of the world kept the New Zealand title Waiata.

The songs "History Never Repeats" and "One Step Ahead" were among the first music videos aired on MTV when the cable television channel launched in the United States in 1981.

Track listing
All songs written by Tim Finn, except where noted.
Side one:
 "Hard Act to Follow" – 3:17
 "One Step Ahead" (Neil Finn) – 2:52
 "I Don't Wanna Dance" – 3:34
 "Iris" (N. Finn) – 2:50
 "Wail" (Eddie Rayner) – 2:49
 "Clumsy" – 3:29

Side two:
 "History Never Repeats" (N. Finn) – 3:00
 "Walking Through the Ruins" – 4:15
 "Ships" (N. Finn) – 3:01
 "Ghost Girl" – 4:26
 "Albert of India" (Rayner) – 4:03

2006 remaster
All songs written by Tim Finn, except where noted.

 "Hard Act to Follow" – 3:21
 "History Never Repeats" (N. Finn) – 2:59
 "I Don't Wanna Dance" – 3:34
 "One Step Ahead" (Neil Finn) – 2:51
 "Walking Through the Ruins" – 4:07
 "Wail" (Eddie Rayner) – 3:09
 "Iris" (N. Finn) – 2:51
 "Clumsy" – 3:32
 "Ghost Girl" – 4:39
 "Ships" (N. Finn) – 3:03
 "Albert of India" (Rayner) – 4:14
 "In the Wars" – 3:33

Personnel

Split Enz
 Tim Finn – vocals
 Neil Finn – vocals, guitar
 Noel Crombie – percussion
 Malcolm Green – drums
 Nigel Griggs – bass
 Edward Rayner – vocals, keyboards
 International Management – Nathan D. Brenner

Charts

Weekly charts

Year-end charts

See also
 List of Top 25 albums for 1981 in Australia

Certifications and sales

References

Split Enz albums
1981 albums
Mushroom Records albums
Albums produced by David Tickle